Events from the year 1898 in Ireland.

Events
By March – Dr. John F. Colohan of Dublin imports the first petrol driven car into Ireland, a Benz Velo.
6 July – Guglielmo Marconi conducts a test radio telegraph transmission for Lloyd's between Ballycastle, County Antrim, and Rathlin Island.
12 August – James Connolly launches the first issue of the Workers' Republic newsletter.
September – Tom Clarke is released after serving 15 years in Pentonville Prison.
20 October – George Curzon is created Baron Curzon of Kedleston, the last appointment to the Peerage of Ireland.
The Local Government (Ireland) Act is introduced. It establishes popularly elected local authorities and gives qualified women a vote for the first time. County Tipperary is divided administratively into North Tipperary (county town: Nenagh) and South Tipperary (county town: Clonmel).
The Mary Immaculate College in Limerick is founded to train Roman Catholic national school teachers.
The Gaelic League holds its first feis at Macroom, County Cork.
Work starts on the building of Belfast City Hall.
Donegal Carpets is established.

Arts and literature
 Eleanor Hull publishes The Cuchullin Saga in Irish Literature, being a collection of stories relating to the hero Cuchullin, translated from the Irish by various scholars.
 Peadar Ua Laoghaire's story  begins serialisation as the first Irish language novel (published in book form 1904).
 Oscar Wilde publishes The Ballad of Reading Gaol.

Sport

Football
International
19 February  Wales 0–1 Ireland (in Llandudno)
5 March Ireland 2–3 England (in Belfast)
26 March  Ireland 0–3 Scotland (in Belfast)

Irish League
Winners: Linfield

Irish Cup
Winners: Linfield 2–0 St Columb's Hall Celtic

Births
6 January – James Fitzmaurice, pilot and aviation pioneer (died 1965).
7 February – Reginald N. Webster, businessman in America and Thoroughbred racehorse owner (died 1983).
13 February – Frank Aiken, Fianna Fáil TD and founding member, Cabinet Minister and Tánaiste (died 1983).
28 February – Hugh O'Flaherty, Catholic priest, saved about 4,000 Allied soldiers and Jews in the Vatican during World War II (died 1963).
18 April – Patrick Hennessy, industrialist (died 1981).
6 June – Ninette de Valois, founder of the Royal Ballet (died 2001).
4 October – Charles McCausland, cricketer (died 1965).
1 November – James Foley, cricketer (died 1969).
25 November – E. Chambré Hardman, photographer (died 1988).
29 November – C. S. Lewis, novelist, author of The Chronicles of Narnia (died 1963).
Full date unknown – Liam Deasy, Irish Republican Army officer in the Irish War of Independence and the Irish Civil War (died 1974).

Deaths
12 January – Daniel Connor, convict transported to Western Australia, businessman (born 1831).
25 January – Frederick Dobson Middleton, British general noted for his service particularly in the North-West Rebellion (born 1825).
14 February – Arthur Gwynn, cricketer and rugby player (born 1874).
13 March – Richard Quain, physician (born 1816).
17 March – John Thomas Ball, lawyer, politician and Lord Chancellor of Ireland, 1875–1881 (born 1815).
24 March – George Thomas Stokes, ecclesiastical historian (born 1843).
28 March – Sir John Arnott, businessman (born 1814 in Scotland).
1 April – Samuel Davidson, biblical scholar (born 1806).
11 May – Dalton McCarthy, lawyer and politician in Canada (born 1836).
29 June – William Knox Leet, recipient of the Victoria Cross for gallantry in 1879 at Inhlobana, Zululand, South Africa (born 1833).
13 August – Charles Frederick Houghton, soldier and politician in Canada (born 1839).
24 November – George James Allman, naturalist, Emeritus Professor of Natural History in Edinburgh (born 1812).
1 December – Charles Magill, member of the 1st Canadian Parliament and mayor of Hamilton (born 1816).

References

 
1890s in Ireland
Ireland
Years of the 19th century in Ireland
Ireland